Campsie railway station is located on the Bankstown line, serving the Sydney suburb of Campsie. It is served by Sydney Trains T3 Bankstown line services.

History
Campsie station opened on 1 February 1895 when the Bankstown line opened from Sydenham to Belmore.

In 1915, the station was remodelled when the Metropolitan Goods Line was built to the north of the existing lines. Platforms were provided that were used by railway workers' trains to Enfield South, Delec and Hope Street. These services ceased in 1996. These shorter platforms remain in situ, however with the Metropolitan Goods Line not connected to the Sydney Trains network, are not used.

In 2001, a new booking office was opened on the footbridge.

In September 2002 a new concourse was complete including the addition of lifts.

The station will be converted to Sydney Metro standards as part of Sydney Metro City & Southwest. This is expected to be completed in 2024. Preliminary works are underway as of late 2019. In May 2020, the concept design for Campsie metro station was released.

Description 
The station has two wide entrances from Beamish St, onto the concourse. Before the Opal ticketing system, the concourse had two large cash + card ticket machines, one card only machine and two ticket windows. All the former ticket machines were removed after paper tickets were phased out, replaced with two card only Opal topup machines. One of these machines can also issue single trip cards. The ticket windows are now permanently closed. Cash is not accepted for tickets or top up at this station, as there are several retailers (e.g. newsagents, Woolworths) nearby able to process Opal top ups.

The concourse is divided by a line of ticket gates of the older type, which originally made to process paper tickets, but now have Opal functionality added on. The station office and toilets are also located on the concourse. From the concourse, there is a lift and steps to each platform.

The left two tracks at Campsie are the Metropolitan Goods Line. Just west of Campsie, they diverge from the Bankstown line and travel toward Enfield Yard. Platforms are provided for these lines, but they are not used and the platform for the Up Goods is not accessible to the public. The two platforms on the right are for the Bankstown line. There are crossovers east and west of the station, however these were not commissioned after being rebuilt in July 2021 and will likely stay out of use until the line is converted to metro operation in 2024.

Both platforms retain their old station buildings, but they are completely closed to the public. The buildings are mostly used as storerooms. Both platforms are also curved, meaning that the guard of a train on platform 2 needs to step off the train to see the whole train. The whole station is equipped with LCD screens and automated announcements showing train times.

Platforms & services

Transport links
Punchbowl Bus Company operates one route from Campsie station:
942: to Lugarno

Transit Systems operate 10 routes via Campsie station:
410: Marsfield to Hurstville
412: to Martin Place via Earlwood, Dulwich Hill and Petersham
413: to Railway Square via Ashbury, Lewisham & Annandale
415: to Chiswick via Burwood
420: Westfield Burwood to Mascot station via Sydney Airport.
445: to Balmain
473: to Rockdale via Earlwood and Arncliffe
487: Canterbury to Bankstown Central
490: Drummoyne to Hurstville
492: Drummoyne to Rockdale via Kingsgrove

Campsie station is served by one NightRide route:
N40: East Hills station to Town Hall station

References

External links

Campsie station details Transport for New South Wales
Campsie Metro station Sydney Metro

City of Canterbury-Bankstown
Easy Access railway stations in Sydney
Railway stations in Sydney
Railway stations in Australia opened in 1895
Bankstown railway line